Boston EMS is a medical documentary series which premiered on ABC on July 25, 2015. It follows one of America's most seasoned team of first responders in Boston, Massachusetts. The series is produced by ABC News through its production subsidiary Lincoln Square Productions, and is part of the production company's True Medicine documentary format.

Episodes

Season 1 (2015)

Season 2 (2016)

References

External links
 
 

2015 American television series debuts
2010s American documentary television series
American Broadcasting Company original programming
English-language television shows
2010s American medical television series
Television shows set in Boston
Television shows filmed in Boston